Lomandra montana is a perennial, rhizomatous herb found in eastern Australia.

References

montana
Asparagales of Australia
Flora of Queensland
Flora of New South Wales
Plants described in 1937